Sangu Chakkaram   is a 2017 Indian Tamil-language fantasy comedy film directed by Maarison, starring stunt master Dhilip Subbarayan, Punnagai Poo Gheetha, N.Raja, Pradeep, Jeremy Roske, Nishesh, Monicka, Swaksha, Abinethra,  Krithik, Adharrsh, Bala, Aditya, Tejo, and Ajeesh.

Cast 

 Swaksha as Jennifer
 Punnagai Poo Gheetha as Angayakanni
 Baby Monika as Malar
 Dhilip Subbarayan as Aagayam
 N. Raja as D'Souza
 Pradeep K. Vijayan as Arivazhagan
 Vinothkumar as Land grabber
 Avan Ivan Ramaraj as Cotton candy seller
 Rocky as Lover
 Meghna as Lover
 Jeremy Roske as Capoeira
 Joel Sangiliyana as Asian exorcist
 Mangalanatha Gurukkal as Exorcist
 Ramki as Exorcist's assistant
 Nishesh as Tamil
 Abinithra as Deepa
 Krithik as Rajesh
 Adharrsh as Darwin
 Bala as Mujeeb
 Aditya as Karthi
 Tejo as Rahul
 Ajeesh
 Prashanth Rangaswamy as Police officer

Production 
Sangu Chakkaram is a fantasy-comedy film made with kids.

Release 
The film is planned to release in the first week of July 2017 however it got released in December 2017. The satellites rights of the film were sold to Sun TV

Critical reception
The Times of India wrote "Given that the horror-comedy wave is now at its ebb, Sanguchakkaram feels late by at least two-three years. It doesn't help that Maarison deals mostly with cliches to tell us his story." New Indian Express wrote "Sangu Chakkaram offers nothing radical in terms of story, but there are certain redemptive moments".

References

External links
 

2017 films
2010s fantasy comedy films
2010s Tamil-language films
Indian children's films
Indian fantasy comedy films
2017 directorial debut films
2017 comedy films